Although most Canadian francophone writers are from Quebec, there are also a number of francophone writers from elsewhere in Canada. These writers may be Acadian, Franco-ontarian or from any other Canadian province.

Some of these writers did move to Quebec at a later stage in their careers, and hence may also be listed at List of Quebec writers, although others did not.

This list includes songwriters as well as literary authors and poets.

Acadian writers

Anselme Chiasson
Herménégilde Chiasson
Gracia Couturier
France Daigle
Clive Doucet
Lennie Gallant
Hélène Harbec
Antonine Maillet
Alfred Silver
Serge Patrice Thibodeau

Franco-Ontarian writers
Marguerite Andersen
Marcel Aymar
Angèle Bassolé-Ouédraogo
Estelle Beauchamp
Michel Bock
Hédi Bouraoui
Lysette Brochu
Lorenzo Cadieux
Franco Catanzariti
Soufiane Chakkouche
Andrée Christensen
Antonio D'Alfonso
Michel Dallaire
Jean-Marc Dalpé
Paul Demers
Robert Dickson
Fernand Dorais
Jean Mohsen Fahmy
Doric Germain
Gaétan Gervais
Joseph Groulx
Brigitte Haentjens
Maurice Henrie
Naim Kattan
Hélène Koscielniak
Chloé LaDuchesse
Michèle Laframboise
Didier Leclair
Françoise Lepage
Daniel Marchildon
Robert Marinier
Melchior Mbonimpa
Blaise Ndala
Gabriel Osson
André Paiement
Rachel Paiement
Robert Paquette
Stéphane Paquette
François Paré
Daniel Poliquin
Gabrielle Poulin
Stefan Psenak
Aurélie Resch
Guy Sylvestre
Lola Lemire Tostevin
Christine Dumitriu Van Saanen

Western Canadian writers

Nancy Huston
Daniel Lavoie
J. R. (Roger) Léveillé
Gabrielle Roy
Annette Saint-Pierre
Ying Chen

French Canadian writers from outside Quebec, List of